The Shower Posse is a Jamaican gang, started by Lester Lloyd Coke, which is involved with drug and arms smuggling. Its home is in Tivoli Gardens in Jamaica, but it primarily operates in the Canadian province of Ontario and the US states of New York, New Jersey and Pennsylvania.

The gang has a strong international presence among expatriate Jamaican communities in North America. In the United States, a branch was founded by Vivian Blake and it has a prominent role in the New York City drug trade. The gang also has a large presence in Toronto.

Name
There are differing reports on the origin of the name. One theory is that it comes from the promises of its associated politicians to shower supporters with gifts. Another view is that it is a reference to the gang showering opponents with bullets. A third theory is that the gang got its name from the Jamaica Labour Party (JLP) election slogan 'Shower', which was a response to the PNP's 'Power' that was coined from Manley's 'Power for the people' slogan in the 1970s.

History

The Jamaica Labour Party-aligned Shower Posse has been provided with arms, training, and transport to the United States by the Central Intelligence Agency (CIA).

On 4 August 1985, a gun battle erupted at a picnic attended by approximately 2,000 Jamaicans in Oakland, New Jersey, during which elements of the Shower Posse and Spangler Posse from Brooklyn and the Bronx fought with the Boston-based Dog Posse and Tel Aviv Posse. Three people were killed, nine were wounded, and police retrieved thirty-three handguns from the scene.

The Shower Posse was involved in a drug war with the Junior Black Mafia in Southwest Philadelphia during the 1980s and early 1990s.

In 1989, former member Charles "Little Nut" Miller was charged with drug trafficking but agreed to testify against other gang leaders in order to receive immunity. In his testimony – in which he implicated himself in nine murders – Miller revealed his connection to the JLP as a "political enforcer", as well as to the CIA, going as far to state that "the United States made me what I am."

In 2009 the United States began to demand that Christopher Coke, then leader of the Shower Posse, with extensive and well-known links to the JLP, be extradited to New York, where he would face charges of smuggling drugs and weapons. Then prime minister of Jamaica, Bruce Golding, who was also the Member of Parliament for that district (West Kingston), initially questioned the legality of the request, claiming that warrantless wiretapping had been used to collect information on Coke. However, he eventually relented, after public indignation to what many Jamaicans viewed as a cover-up to protect a politically connected drug trafficker, and on 17 May 2010 an arrest warrant was issued for Coke, leading to a state of civil unrest within Kingston, and especially Tivoli Gardens.
Coke was eventually arrested outside of Kingston on 22 June 2010.  On Friday, 15 June 2012, a New York federal district court sentenced Coke to two consecutive sentences: 20 years for racketeering and conspiracy, and an additional three years for conspiracy to commit assault.

In January 2021, the former lieutenant of the Shower Posse, Harry "Harry Dog" McLeod, was shot and killed in an attack in Kingston.

In popular culture
The 2014 novel A Brief History of Seven Killings by Marlon James features a gang called Storm Posse, who share many features with Shower Posse, based in a fictionalised version of Tivoli Gardens named "Copenhagen City".

Christopher Coke and the Shower Posse were the subject of an episode of the Netflix documentary series, Drug Lords, released in 2018.

References

 
Politics of Jamaica
Drugs in Jamaica
Kingston, Jamaica
Transnational organized crime
Organized crime groups in Canada
Gangs in Toronto
Organized crime groups in Jamaica
Organized crime groups in the United States
Gangs in Florida
Gangs in New Jersey
Gangs in New York City
Gangs in Philadelphia
1980s establishments in Jamaica